The Canon EF 800mm 5.6L IS USM lens is a super-telephoto lens by Canon Inc., released at a manufacturer's suggested retail price of US$11,999.00 and now selling at an MSRP of $12,999.00.

Technical information
The EF 800mm 5.6L IS USM is a professional L series lens released June 2008. This lens is constructed with a magnesium alloy body and mount and with plastic extremities and switches. Features of this lens are: a wide rubber focus ring that is damped, a focus distance window, the ability to limit the focus range, a focus-preset mechanism, an image stabilizer that is effective up to four stops and is tripod sensing, an AF stop switch, and weather sealing. A maximum aperture of 5.6 gives this lens the ability to create depth of field effects. The optical construction of this lens contains two fluorite lens elements, and "Super UD" (Ultra low dispersion) and UD Lens elements. This lens uses an inner focusing system powered by a ring type USM motor. This lens is compatible with the Canon Extender EF teleconverters.

References

External links
 EF800mm f/5.6L IS USM at the Canon Camera Museum
 Canon USA, PR, October 15, 2007
 Canon USA, PR, January 23, 2008

Canon EF lenses
Camera lenses introduced in 2008